Kulung (autonym: Kulu riŋ, [kulu rɪŋ]) is one of the Rai languages; it is spoken by an estimated 33,000 people. Van Driem (2001) includes Chukwa as a dialect.

Locations
Kulung in some ten villages along the upper reaches of the Huṅga or Hoṅgu River (a tributary of the Dūdhkosī), in Solukhumbu District of Sagarmāthā Zone, Nepal. The main Kulung-speaking villages are Chhemsi and Chheskam. The particular dialect of the language spoken in these two villages is considered by the Kulung to be the most original form of their language. Downstream, on both sides of the Huṅga river, in villages that are now called Luchcham, Gudel, Chocholung, Nāmluṅg, Pilmo, Bung, Chhekmā, and Sātdi, less prestigious varieties of Kulung are spoken.

Ethnologue lists the following Kulung villages:
Hongu River valley, Solukhumbu District, Sagarmatha Zone: Bung, Pelmang, Chhemsing, Chheskam, Lucham, Chachalung, Satdi, Gudel, Namlung, Sotang, and Chekma villages
Sankhuwasabha district, Kosi Zone: Mangtewa, Yaphu, and Seduwa VDCs
Bhojpur District, Kosi Zone: Phedi, Limkhim, Khartanga, and Wasepla

Phonology
Dialects of the Kulung language include Sotang (Sotaring, Sottaring), Mahakulung, Tamachhang, Pidisoi, Chhapkoa, Pelmung, Namlung, and Khambu. Kulung distinguishes among eight vowels and 11 diphthongs. There are three series of stops: dorso-velar, dental, and labial, each series having an unaspirated voiceless, aspirated voiceless, and unaspirated voiced variant. There are three voiced nasals, four approximants, one vibrant, one fricative, and three affricates.

Vowels
Kulung has six short vowels and six long vowels:

 Front and central vowels are unrounded, whereas back vowels are rounded.

Consonants

Nominal morphology
To the nominal categories belong the following parts of speech: nouns, adjectives, pronouns and numerals. There are unambiguous morphological criteria for distinguishing between nouns and verbs. Whereas nouns can be marked for case and number, finite verbs are marked for person, number, and tense. There is no grammatical gender in Kulung.

Personal pronouns
The ten Kulung personal pronouns have three number distinctions (singular, dual, and plural) and three person distinctions (first person, second person and third person) as well as an inclusive/exclusive distinction. There are no gender distinctions.

Cases
Kulung has thirteen cases. Case endings are attached to nouns with or without the non-singular suffix. Allomorphy of case endings depends on whether the noun ends in a vowel or consonant. Below the case endings of the noun lam 'road' are presented.

Verbal morphology
The Kulung verb is characterised by a system of complex pronominalisation, in which paradigmatic stem alternation is found. Personal endings consist of morphemes expressing notions like tense, agent, patient, number, and exclusivity. Depending on the number of verbal stems and their position in the verbal paradigm, every verb in Kulung belongs to a certain conjugation type. Complete conjugations of verbs belonging to the different conjugation types are presented in the second appendix. Like in other Kiranti languages, compound verbs are found in Kulung. These compound verbs consist of a verb stem and an auxiliary that adds semantic notions to the main verb. Other verbal constructions found in Kulung are a gerund, imperative, supine and an infinitive.

References

Bibliography

External links
WALS - Kulung
Himalayan Languages Project

Kiranti languages
Kulung
Languages of Koshi Province